The Copa Confraternidad del Caribe is the second most important race in the Caribbean Series festival.

Winners

Horse racing